Renate Schmidt ( Pokorny; born 12 December 1943 in Hanau) is a German Social Democratic politician.

Early life
Schmidt grew up in Coburg, Fürth, and Nuremberg. Due to a pregnancy at the age of 17, she was forced to leave school a year before she would have received her Abitur. Her future husband, Gerhard Schmidt († 1984), with the assistance of both their families, supported her in raising the child while he attended university. In 1963 and 1970, she bore two more children. In 1974 her husband gave up his work as an architect, as her salary was bigger than his. Unusual for those times, he took charge of the household and cared for the children.

Labor and political career
Having worked at Quelle AG for quite a while, Schmidt was elected to the company's works council in 1972; she was not required to work from 1973 to 1980, because of this.  From 1980 to 1988, she was the Bavarian state chairwoman of the labor union HBV ; meaning Labor Union Trade, Banks and Insurances).

Schmidt joined the SPD in 1972. In 1973, she and her husband founded a local chapter of the SPD youth organization. In 1980, she was elected to the Bundestag. From 1987 to 1990, she was deputy chairwoman of the SPD Fraktion in the Bundestag; from 1990 to 1994, she was Vice-President of the Bundestag.

Here again, she was the leader of the SPD group until 2000.

In 1999, she announced she would retire from politics. However, she had to change her mind in 2002, for on 22 October of the same year she became Federal Minister for Family Affairs, Senior Citizens, Women and Youth. After the grand coalition took over power in 2005, Schmidt was discharged from her office and replaced by Ursula von der Leyen. However, she had been elected member of the Bundestag again. In 2009, she no longer stood for election and retired from official politics.

Later life
Schmidt lives in Nuremberg, with her second husband Hasso von Henninges. She was bestowed honorary citizenship of her hometown in 2014.

Recognition
 2011 – Max Friedlaender Prize

Books
 Renate Schmidt: "Was ich will" Im Gespräch mit Manfred E. Berger, ECON Verlag, 1994
 Renate Schmidt: Mut zur Menschlichkeit, ECON Verlag, 1995
 Renate Schmidt: SOS Familie. Ohne Kinder sehen wir alt aus, Rowohlt Verlag, 2002

References

External links
  Official website
  Federal Ministry for Family Affairs, Senior Citizens, Women and Youth (German language)

1943 births
Living people
Federal government ministers of Germany
Members of the Bundestag for Bavaria
Female members of the Bundestag
Ministers for children, young people and families
Women federal government ministers of Germany
21st-century German women politicians
Members of the Bundestag 2005–2009
Members of the Bundestag for the Social Democratic Party of Germany
Works councillors